Claire Wong is a Malaysian actor, director, producer, and filmmaker. She is the co-founder and Joint Artistic Director and Producer of Checkpoint Theatre. Wong writes, directs, produces, and acts for the stage and for the camera. She has received training in both Asian and Western performing arts and obtained her post-graduate degree, a Master of Fine Arts (MFA), from Columbia University. Wong's recent producing and directing credits include: Huzir Sulaiman's The Last Bull: A Life in Flamenco (Singapore Arts Festival, now Singapore Festival of Arts (SIFA) Commission, 2016), Occupation (2012) and The Weight of Silk on Skin (2011); Faith Ng's Normal (2017, 2015), For Better or for Worse (2013) and wo(men) (2010); Joel Tan's The Way We Go (2014). Her play Recalling Mother which was co-written and co-directed with Noorlinah Mohamed, recently played at Esplanade's The Studios (Singapore, 2016) and at the Brisbane and OzAsia Festivals (Australia, 2016 and 2017).

Wong holds a law degree from the National University of Singapore, and practised litigation and corporate law. She is also the co-founder and Senior Consultant of Studio Wong Huzir, a creative consultancy.

Early life and education
Wong was born in Penang, Malaysia to a police officer father and housewife mother and grew up in Kuala Lumpur when her father was assigned to work at the police headquarters there. She was the youngest of five children in the family.

In high school, Wong represented Selangor state in badminton competitions and was appointed the president of the literary, drama and debate society. Upon her graduation, she stayed with her relatives in Singapore and attended National Junior College. She studied the sciences, and took part in school plays to further her interest in drama. Wong studied law at the National University of Singapore and obtained her Master of Fine Arts in theatre at Columbia University in New York.

Legal career 
Wong practised law first as a litigation associate and later as a corporate partner. Her corporate practice covered both Singapore and the region. She worked initially at the Allen & Gledhill and then as a partner at Helen Yeo & Partners in Singapore and Freehills in Sydney.

Theatre career
During the 1990s Wong performed in leading roles in Ong Keng Sen's post-modern Flowers of Destiny, Madame Mao's Memories, and Desdemona.  More recently, she has acted in Huzir Sulaiman's Atomic Jaya, Cogito, and Occupation. Her performance Atomic Jaya garnered her nominations for Best Actress and Best Ensemble Performance in both the Singapore Life! Theatre Awards and the Malaysian Cameronian Arts Awards respectively. She was also nominated for the Best Actress award for Occupation. Wong is a co-founder of creative consultancy Studio Wong Huzir and serves as its Senior Consultant. She was also the Head of Corporate Communications for Rodyk & Davidson, Singapore's first and oldest law firm, where she also oversees the firm's in-house training programme, and is a Joint Artistic Director of Checkpoint Theatre. She left Rodyk & Davidson at the end of November 2014 to spend more time with her elderly parents and focus on theatre.

As a director, she was nominated for Best Director in the Singapore's Life! Theatre Awards for the landmark production of the trilogy of plays by Eleanor Wong, Invitation To Treat (2003). Wong co-directed the Singapore Arts Festival commission Occupation (2002). She received the Life! Theatre Award nomination for Best Director. Her other theatre directing credits include Up North Down South (2002) and Election Day (2004). For the 2006 International Festival of Women in Contemporary Theatre, she co-created and performed in the piece Recalling Mother.

Her screen directing began in 2005, when she wrote and directed a television film, Project Peter, for Singapore's Arts Central channel. She wrote and directed a short film in Malaysia, Instant Noodles and Hot Chocolate, and was the script consultant and performer in That Historical Feeling, a Malaysian short film, which won a Bronze award at the Malaysian Video Awards. Wong has taught at the National University of Singapore, at both the Faculty of Law and in the Theatre Studies department.

Personal life 
Wong married Huzir Sulaiman, a director and actor, in 2004. Wong is a permanent resident in Singapore.

Selected filmography and theatre

Actor

Director

References

External links
 Interview at assuntaalumni.com

Living people
National University of Singapore alumni
20th-century Singaporean lawyers
Singaporean stage actresses
Singaporean people of Chinese descent
Columbia University School of the Arts alumni
Malaysian emigrants to Singapore
Singaporean film directors
Singaporean women film directors
Year of birth missing (living people)
20th-century Singaporean actresses
Singaporean women lawyers